Khasala Kalan is a village of Rawalpindi District in the Punjab province of Pakistan. It is located at 33°26'24N 72°58'25E with an altitude of 370 meters (1,217 ft) and lies south of the Rawalpindi on Adyala road and approximately about 6 km meter ahead from Adyala jail. A significant proportion of the population belong to the Araien and Rajput families. A small dam is Located Behind The Village Khasala Kalan.

References

External links
 Khasala.Kalan facebook page

Populated places in Rawalpindi District